P17 may refer to:
 P-17 (Dubai), a proposed skyscraper in the United Arab Emirates
 p17 protein, a protein of the HIV virus
 Papyrus 17, a biblical manuscript

See also
 17P (disambiguation)